Haplochromis aff. bloyeti is a species of fish in the family Cichlidae. It is endemic to Kenya.  Its natural habitats are rivers and freshwater lakes.

Sources 

Fish described in 1883
Haplochromis
Endemic freshwater fish of Kenya
Taxonomy articles created by Polbot
Undescribed vertebrate species
Taxobox binomials not recognized by IUCN